The Basset Hound is a short-legged breed of dog in the hound family. The Basset is a scent hound that was originally bred for the purpose of hunting hare. Their sense of smell and ability to ground-scent is second only to the Bloodhound.

Basset Hounds are one of six recognized "basset"-type breeds in France. The name Basset is derived from the French word bas, meaning 'low', with the attenuating suffix -et—together meaning 'rather low'. Basset Hounds are usually bicolours or tricolours of standard hound coloration.

Description

Appearance
Bassets are large, short, solid and long, with curved sabre tails held high over their long backs. This breed, relative to its size, is heavier-boned than any other.

This breed, like its ancestor the Bloodhound, has a hanging skin structure, which causes the face to tend to have a sad look; this, for many people, adds to the breed's charm. The dewlap, seen as the loose, elastic skin around the neck, and the trailing ears which along with the Bloodhound are the longest of any breed, help trap the scent of what they are tracking. Its neck is wider than its head. This, combined with the loose skin around its face and neck means that flat collars can easily be pulled off. The previous FCI standard described the characteristic skin of the Basset, which resembles its ancestor the Bloodhound as "loose". This wording has since been updated to "supple and elastic". The looseness of the skin results in the Basset's characteristic facial wrinkles. They drool a lot due to their loose flews.

The Basset's skull is characterised by its large long nose, which is second only to the Bloodhound in scenting ability and number of olfactory receptor cells.

The Basset's short legs are due to a form of dwarfism (see: Health). Their short stature can be deceiving; Bassets are surprisingly long and can reach things on table tops that other dogs of similar heights cannot. Because Bassets are so heavy and have such short legs, they are not able to hold themselves above water for very long when swimming, and should always be closely supervised in the water.

Coat
The short-haired coat of a Basset is smooth and soft, and sheds constantly. Any hound coloration is acceptable, but this varies from country to country. They are usually black, tan and white tricolors or tan and white bicolors. Tan can vary from reddish-brown and red to lemon. Lemon and white is a less common color. Some Bassets are also classified as gray or blue - this color is considered rare and undesirable in the show ring.

The source of color is the E Locus (MC1R), which has four alleles: EM, EG, E, and e. The EM, E and e alleles are present in the Basset Hounds. The E allele allows for the production of both red and black pigments, so is present with the majority of color patterns in Basset Hounds.

Red and lemon colors are caused by the e allele of MC1R. The e allele is recessive, so red and lemon dogs are homozygous e/e. Lemon dogs are lighter in color than reds, but the genetic mechanism that dilutes phaeomelanin in this instance is unknown. No black hairs will be present on either red or lemon dogs. If there are any black hairs, the dog is officially a tricolor.

The EM allele produces a black mask on the face that may extend up around the eyes and onto the ears. This pattern is most easily seen on mahogany dogs, although any Basset color pattern may express the EM allele, except for "red and white" or "lemon and white" due to e/e.

Many Bassets have a clearly defined white blaze and a white tip to their tail, intended to aid hunters in finding their dogs when tracking through underbrush.

Like all dogs, the Basset Hound's coat is naturally oily. The oil in their coat has a distinctive "hound scent", which is natural to the breed.

Temperament
The Basset Hound is a friendly, outgoing, and playful dog, tolerant of children and other pets. They are extremely vocal and famously devoted to tracking. They are also widely known for being stubborn. Prospective owners must be prepared to handle Bassets firmly and patiently.

Health

Ears
Basset Hounds have large pendulous ears (known as "leathers") that are very easily infected. Their ears are also very sensitive and do not allow air to circulate inside them, unlike other breeds with erect or more open ears. A Basset Hound's ears must be cleaned inside and out frequently to avoid infections and ear mites.

Short stature
According to the Basset Hound Club of America, the height of a Basset should not exceed .

The Basset Hound's short stature is due to the genetic condition osteochondrodysplasia (meaning abnormal growth of both bone and cartilage). Dwarfism of this type in most animals is traditionally known as achondroplasia. Basset Hounds, Dachshunds and Bulldogs are a few of the dog breeds classified as achondroplastic. This bone growth abnormality may be a predisposing factor in the development of elbow dysplasia seen in the breed, which leads to arthritis of the elbow joint.

Other health issues

In addition to ear problems, Basset Hounds may be susceptible to eye issues. Because of their droopy eyes the area under the eyeball can collect dirt and become clogged with a mucus.

Basset Hounds are prone to yeast infections in the folds around the mouth, where drool can collect without thoroughly drying out.

Overweight Basset Hounds develop many serious health issues, including bone and joint injuries, gastric dilatation volvulus and paralysis.

The only recent mortality and morbidity surveys of Basset Hounds are from the UK: a 1999 longevity survey with a small sample size of 10 deceased dogs and a 2004 UK Kennel Club health survey with a larger sample size of 142 deceased dogs and 226 live dogs. See Mortality and Morbidity below.

Mortality
Median longevity of Basset Hounds is about 10.3 years in France and 11.3 years in the UK, which is a typical median longevity for purebred dogs and for breeds similar in size to Basset Hounds. The oldest of the 142 deceased dogs in the 2004 UK Kennel Club survey was 16.7 years. Leading causes of death in the 2004 UK Kennel Club survey were cancer (31%), old age (13%), gastric dilatation volvulus (11%), and cardiac (8%).

Morbidity
Among the 226 live Basset Hounds in the 2004 UKC survey, the most-common health issues noted by owners were dermatologic (such as dermatitis), reproductive, musculoskeletal (for example, arthritis and lameness), and gastrointestinal (for example, gastric dilatation volvulus and colitis). Basset Hounds are also prone to epilepsy, glaucoma, luxating patella, thrombopathia, Von Willebrand disease, hypothyroidism, hip dysplasia, and elbow dysplasia.

History

St Hubert's Hound

The Basset type originated in France, and is descended from the 6th-century hounds belonging to St Hubert of Belgium, which through breeding at the Benedictine Abbey of St. Hubert eventually became what is known as the St Hubert's Hound around 1000 AD. St Hubert's original hounds are descended from the Laconian (Spartan) Hound, one of four groups of dogs discerned from Greek representations and descriptions. These scent hounds were described as large, slow, "short-legged and deep mouthed" dogs with a small head, straight nose, upright ears and long neck, and either tan with white markings or black with tan markings. Laconian Hounds were reputed to not give up the scent until they found their prey. They eventually found their way to Constantinople, and from there to Europe.

France

The first mention of a "Basset" dog appeared in La Venerie, an illustrated hunting text written by Jacques du Fouilloux in 1585. The dogs in Fouilloux's text were used to hunt foxes and badgers. It is believed that the Basset type originated as a mutation in the litters of Norman Staghounds, a descendant of the St Hubert's Hound. These precursors were most likely bred back to the St. Hubert's Hound, among other derivative French hounds. Until after the French Revolution around the year 1789, hunting from horseback was the preserve of kings, large aristocratic families and of the country squires, and for this reason short-legged dogs were highly valued for hunting on foot.

Basset-type hounds became popular during the reign of Emperor Napoleon III (r. 1852–1870). In 1853, Emmanuel Fremiet, "the leading sculptor of animals in his day" exhibited bronze sculptures of Emperor Napoleon III's Basset Hounds at the Paris Salon. Ten years later in 1863 at the first exhibition of dogs held in Paris, Basset Hounds attained international attention.

The controlled breeding of the short haired Basset began in France in 1870. From the existing Bassets, Count Le Couteulx of Canteleu fixed a utilitarian type with straight front legs known as the Chien d'Artois, whereas Mr. Louis Lane developed a more spectacular type, with crooked front legs, known as the Basset Normand. These were bred together to create the original Basset Artésien Normand.

England
French Basset Hounds were being imported into England at least as early as the 1870s. While some of these dogs were certainly Basset Artésien Normands, by the 1880s linebreeding had thrown back to a different heavier type. Everett Millais, who is considered to be the father of the modern Basset Hound, bred one such dog, Nicholas, to a Bloodhound bitch named Inoculation through artificial insemination in order to create a heavier Basset in England in the 1890s. The litter was delivered by caesarean section, and the surviving pups were refined with French and English Bassets. The first breed standard for what is now known as the Basset Hound was made in Great Britain at the end of 19th century. This standard was updated in 2010.

Hunting with Bassets
The Basset Hound was bred to hunt, with a keen nose and short stature suited to small-game hunting on foot. A variety of Basset Hound developed purely for hunting by Colonel Morrison was admitted to the Masters of Basset Hounds Association in 1959 via an appendix to the Stud Book. This breed differs in being straighter and longer in the leg and having shorter ears.

In popular culture
Basset Hounds have been featured in popular culture many times. Some artists, such as director Mamoru Oshii and webcomic artist Scott Kurtz regularly feature their pet Bassets in their work.

On February 27, 1928, Time magazine featured a Basset Hound on the front cover. The accompanying story was about the 52nd annual Westminster Kennel Club Dog Show at Madison Square Garden as if observed by the Basset Hound puppy.

Many cartoon dogs are based on the Basset, such as Droopy, with several Bassets appearing in animated Disney films. Syndicated comic strip Fred Basset has been a regular feature in newspapers since 1963.

There is a Basset Hound in the Smokey and the Bandit movie series. The dog, Fred, was personally picked by lead actor Burt Reynolds because it refused to obey commands.

In the TV series The Dukes of Hazzard, a Basset Hound called Flash served as a companion to Sheriff Rosco P. Coltrane.

In the series Foofur, a Basset Hound named Dolly, is the affection of Foofur and Burt's.

In Disney's 1986 film The Great Mouse Detective, a Basset Hound named Toby is the dog of Sherlock Holmes.

Stella, in The Princess and the Frog, is a Basset Hound.

In the early days of television, Elvis Presley famously sang "Hound Dog" to a disinterested top hat-wearing Basset Hound named Sherlock on The Steve Allen Show on July 1, 1956. Lassie had a Basset friend named Pokey early in the Lassie television series. Other famous TV Bassets are the wisecracking Cleo from The People's Choice, and the sheriff's dog Flash in The Dukes of Hazzard. Another television Basset in the 1950s was Morgan. He appeared often on The Garry Moore Show, The Jackie Gleason Show and many other variety shows. He played a dog from Pluto on Captain Video and appeared in a Dean Martin and Jerry Lewis movie. His last appearance was on the Hallmark Hall of Fame, playing against Tom Bosley in 1959. He had a plush toy modeled on him. and appeared in a Life magazine article. (Despite the article, he was never known as J J Morgan).

In the television series Columbo, Lieutenant Columbo owns a Basset Hound named Dog. Originally, it was not going to appear in the show because Peter Falk believed that it "already had enough gimmicks" but once the two met, Falk stated that Dog "was exactly the type of dog that Columbo would own", so he was added to the show and made his first appearance in 1972's "Étude In Black".

In the young adult novel The Disreputable History of Frankie Landau-Banks, the Basset Hound is the symbol of college society the Loyal Order of the Basset Hound.

Basset Hounds are often used as advertising logos. The logo for Hush Puppies brand shoes prominently features a Basset Hound whose real name is Jason.  Basset Hounds are occasionally referred to as "hush puppies" for that reason. A Basset Hound also serves as the companion to the lonely Maytag Man in Maytag appliance advertisements. Tidewater Petroleum advertised its "Flying A" gasoline using a Basset Hound named Axelrod.

In video game series Freedom Planet, one of characters is an anthropomorphic Basset-Hound called Milla.

In the TV animated series PAW Patrol, season 9 introduced a Basset Hound pup named Al who is a truck driver which he speaks trucker and a member of the Paw Patrol.

Related breeds
 Albany and West Lodge Bassets
 Basset Artesien Normand
 Basset Bleu de Gascogne
 Basset Fauve de Bretagne
 Grand Basset Griffon Vendéen
 Petit Basset Griffon Vendéen
 Bloodhound

See also
 Dogs portal
 List of dog breeds

References

External links

 —An active listing of Basset Hound links

Dog breeds originating in France
Dog breeds originating in England
FCI breeds
Hunting with hounds
Scent hounds